The Myanmar Traditional Lethwei Federation (MTLF) is one of two major organizations which sanctions professional Lethwei bouts worldwide and the only one who oversees Lethwei competitions in Myanmar.

History
The Myanmar Traditional Lethwei Federation or MTLF is a branch of the Myanmar's Ministry of Health and Sports. The federation was initially founded in 1995 as the Myanmar Traditional Boxing Federation, since Lethwei is translated to Boxing in Burmese language. In 2019, the federation adapted its name to the MTLF - Myanmar Traditional Lethwei Federation, reflecting a more modern approach to the world.

Competitions and organizations sanctioned by the MTLF
 All Lethwei events across Myanmar
 World Lethwei Championship
 Internation Lethwei Federation Japan
 Taiwan Lethwei Federation

Lethwei in Japan 
In 2016, the MTLF granted a ‘’Grade-A’’ promoter licence from the International Lethwei Federation Japan allowing them to organize traditional Lethwei events in Japan.

Sponsorships 
Since 1990's, MTLF has been the sponsor of Thein Pyu Stadium in Yangon, Myanmar and holds an office space in the premise.

See also

 List of Lethwei fighters 
 World Lethwei Championship
 Internation Lethwei Federation Japan

References

External links
 

Lethwei organizations
Sports ministries
Lethwei
Sports organizations established in 1995